Downton Abbey is a British period drama television series created by Julian Fellowes and co-produced by Carnival Films and Masterpiece. It first aired on ITV in the United Kingdom on 26 September 2010 and on PBS in the United States on 9 January 2011 as part of the Masterpiece Classic anthology.

Downton Abbey has received critical acclaim from television critics and won numerous accolades, including a Golden Globe Award for Best Miniseries or Television Film, a BAFTA award and a Primetime Emmy Award for Outstanding Miniseries. It was recognised by Guinness World Records as the most critically acclaimed English-language television series of 2011.  It earned the most nominations of any international television series in the history of the Primetime Emmy Awards, with twenty-seven in total (after two seasons). It was the most watched television series on both ITV and PBS, and subsequently became the most successful British costume drama series since the 1981 television serial of Brideshead Revisited. By the third series, it had become one of the most widely watched television shows in the world.

Media recognition 
Downton Abbey was placed tenth on The Guardian's list of the Top 10 TV programmes of 2010, and came second in the Top 10 TV dramas of 2010 list, beaten only by Doctor Who. It came first in the Top 10 new drama category.

In September 2011, the show entered the Guinness Book of World Records as the 'most critically acclaimed television show' for the year, becoming the first British show to win the award. It beat American shows Mad Men and Modern Family to the title.

Also in 2012, Downton Abbey was parodied on Saturday Night Live, where they imagined how the show might be advertised on the male-oriented Spike TV network, calling it "fancy Entourage."

Industry recognition 
It won two Broadcasting Press Guild awards in 2011. It won Best Drama Series and Julian Fellowes won for writing. It has also won 6 Primetime Emmy Awards.

The programme was nominated for multiple BAFTAs including the Audience Award, losing to The Only Way is Essex and Best Drama, ultimately losing to Sherlock.

In 2012, Downton Abbey won the 'Best Drama Award' at the National Television Awards. Downton Abbey also won Best TV Show Award at the 2012 Elle Style Awards.

In July 2012, Downton Abbey was nominated for 16 Primetime Emmy Awards.

On 15 September, at the Primetime Creative Arts Emmy Awards, John Lunn received the Emmy for Outstanding Music Composition for Series (Original Dramatic Score), while Anne ‘Nosh’ Oldham and Christine Greenwood won the Outstanding Hairstyling for A Single Camera Series Award.

On 23 September, at the Primetime Emmy Awards, Maggie Smith took home the Outstanding Supporting Actress Award in a Drama Series.

On 20 November, Downton Abbey was shortlisted for International Programme Sales at the 2013 Broadcast Awards. The International Programme Sales category aims to recognize a UK-produced programme that has made a significant impact internationally.

On 29 November 2012, the producers of Downton Abbey were nominated for The Norman Felton Award for Outstanding Producer of Episodic Television (Drama) at the 2013 Producers Guild Awards.

On 12 December, Downton Abbey received three nominations at the 2013 Screen Actors Guild Awards. Downton was nominated for Outstanding Performance by an Ensemble In a Drama Series, while Michelle Dockery and Maggie Smith were both nominated for Outstanding Performance by a Female Actor in a Drama Series.

On 13 December 2012, the Hollywood Foreign Press Association nominated Downton Abbey in three categories for the 70th Golden Globe Awards. Downton Abbey received a nomination for Best Television Series (Drama), Michelle Dockery for Best Performance by an Actress in a Television Series (Drama), and Maggie Smith for Best Performance by an Actress in a Supporting Role in a Series, Miniseries or Motion Picture Made for Television.

Actor Allen Leech, who plays Tom Branson, has been nominated for the Best Actor in a Supporting Role Television award at the 2013 Irish Film and Television Awards, which take place in February 2013.

On 23 January 2013, Downton Abbey won Best Drama at the 2013 National Television Awards, one year after earning the Best Drama prize at the 2012 NTAs.

On 27 January 2013 the cast of Downton Abbey won Outstanding Performance by an Ensemble in a Drama Series at the 19th annual Screen Actors Guild Awards.

In August 2015, Downton Abbey was presented with a BAFTA special award at the Richmond Theatre.

Awards and nominations

Television series

Film

References 

Awards
Emmy Award-winning programs
Downton Abbey
Awards and nominations received by Downton Abbey